Galand (also known as Findarisk and Garland) is a village in Daland Rural District, in the Central District of Ramian County, Golestan Province, Iran. At the 2006 census, its population was 2,485, in 571 families.

References 

Populated places in Ramian County